The 2020–21 Indiana State Sycamores men's basketball team represented Indiana State University in the 2020–21 NCAA Division I men's basketball season. The Sycamores, led by 11th-year head coach Greg Lansing, played their home games at the newly renovated Hulman Center in Terre Haute, Indiana as members of the Missouri Valley Conference. In a season limited by the ongoing COVID-19 pandemic, the Sycamores finished the season 15–10, 11–7 in MVC play to finish in fourth place. They defeated Evansville in the quarterfinals of the MVC tournament before losing to Loyola in the semifinals.

Previous season
The Sycamores finished the 2019–20 season 18–12, 11–7 in MVC play to finish in a tie for third place. They lost in the quarterfinals of the MVC tournament to Missouri State.

Roster

Schedule and results 

|-
!colspan=12 style=| Non-conference regular season

|-
!colspan=12 style=|Missouri Valley regular season

|-
!colspan=12 style=| MVC tournament
|-

|-

Source

References

Indiana State Sycamores men's basketball seasons
Indiana State Sycamores
Indiana State Sycamores men's basketball
Indiana State Sycamores men's basketball